Alex Yamoah (born 10 January 1995) is a Ghanaian footballer who currently plays as a midfielder for FK Zeta.

Career statistics

Club

Notes

References

1995 births
Living people
Association football midfielders
Ghanaian footballers
Veria F.C. players
FK Zeta players
Football League (Greece) players
Montenegrin First League players
Ghanaian expatriate footballers
Expatriate footballers in Greece
Ghanaian expatriate sportspeople in Greece
Expatriate footballers in Montenegro
Vision F.C. players